{{Infobox brand
| name           = Clear
| logo           = Clear logo 2014.png
| logo_upright   = 
| logo_alt       = 
| logo_caption   = 
| image          = 
| image_upright  = 
| alt            = 
| caption        = 
| producttype    = Anti-dandruff shampoo
| currentowner   = Unilever
| producedby     = 
| country        = Worldwide (originated from Italy)
| introduced     =  (as Clinic)   (as Clear)
| related        = Ultrex (Greece)  Linic (Portugal)  Pure Derm (India) 
| markets        = Worldwide
| former names   = Clinic (1975-1981)
| previousowners = 
| trademarkregistrations = 
| ambassadors    = Agnes Monica (Indonesia) Cristiano Ronaldo (Portugal)
| tagline        = Nothing to Hide
| website        = 
}}Clear is a global brand of anti-dandruff shampoo, the manufacturer is owned by the British-Dutch company Unilever. The brand was launched in 1975 as Clinic shampoo until 1981, and re-branded as Clear in 1982. Clear shampoo, as traced from its history, is originated from Italy. It is sold under the Clear name in most certain global countries, and also known as Ultrex in Greece, Linic in Portugal and Clear in India. Until 2010, the product was sold in Thailand under the name Clinic Clear''', and Clinic before the early 2000s.

Music Program Sponsorship 
In Indonesia, the Music Chart Show called Clear Top 10 which Broadcast by RCTI year 1999-2003 and Indosiar year 2003-2005

See also
List of Unilever brands

External links

Hair care products
Products introduced in 1982
Shampoo brands
Unilever brands